Gunnar Knudsen (19 September 1848 – 1 December 1928), born Aanon Gunerius Knudsen, was a Norwegian politician from the Liberal Party who served as the 11th Prime Minister of Norway twice from 1908 to 1910 and from 1913 to 1920. He also inherited a shipping company, and founded the shipping company Borgestad ASA.

Early life and education 
Knudsen was born in 1848 at the medium-sized farm Saltrød at Stokken (now Arendal)  in Aust-Agder. Norway.  His father Christen Knudsen (1813–1888)  was a sea captain and ship-owner, whose ancestors had lived at the farm for several generations. His mother Guro Aadnesdatter  (1808–1900)  had grown up at one of the smaller farms in Saltrød which her father which hailed from Vegusdal had bought. A brother of Gunnar died in 1855, his two living siblings were Jørgen Christian Knudsen (born 1843) and Ellen Serine (born 1846) who married Johan Jeremiassen.

Christen Knudsen established a shipyard in Arendal in 1851, but in 1855 he and the family moved to Frednes in Porsgrunn.
Gunnar Knudsen started studying at Chalmers University of Technology in Gothenburg, Sweden in 1865 where he got a degree as engineer in 1867.

Business career
Returning to Norway, he started working at Aker's Mechanical Workshop and then went to England where he studied ship building technics at Piles Shipyard in Sunderland. The first ship he designed for the family's shipyard was Gambetta, named after the French politician Léon Gambetta. It was launched in 1871. The stay in England convinced Knudsen that the days of sail ships would soon be over and that the family business needed to start building steam ships in the future.

Gunnar and his brother Jørgen Christian took over the shipyard from their father in 1872. In the following years they would also take over ships their father owned and the brothers formed a shipyard and shipping company together: J.C. og G. Knudsen. In the period until 1879, Knudsen designed five ships for the company. He named the fifth Crossroad; it was the last sail ship he designed. In 1904, he merged his interests in three steam ship  companies  into Borgestad Shipping AS.

Political career
In 1886, he became the mayor of Gjerpen and in 1891 elected  governor of Telemark. In 1891 Knudsen was elected to the Storting,  becoming parliamentary leader in 1908 and party leader from 1909 to 1927. He was elected Prime Minister in 1908 and 1913. In social policy, Knudsen's time as prime minister saw the passage of the Sickness insurance Law of September 1909, which provided compulsory coverage for employees and workers below a certain income limit, representing approximately 45% of all wage earners. That same year, the state approved free midwife services for unmarried mothers. In 1915, free midwife services were extended to the wives of men included under the national health insurance scheme.

Personal life
Gunnar Knudsen married Anna Sofie Cappelen  (1854–1915) in 1880, and together they had five children, born between 1882 and 1893; Erik, Christen, Gudrun, Margit and Rolf. Margit, married Schiøtt, was elected to the national parliament in 1945. Christen Knudsen had a son Knut Andreas Knudsen who became a politician as well.

See also
Knudsen's First Cabinet
Knudsen's Second Cabinet

References

Sources

External links
Borgestad ASA website

1848 births
1928 deaths
Presidents of the Storting
Members of the Storting
Liberal Party (Norway) politicians
Government ministers of Norway
Prime Ministers of Norway
Ministers of Agriculture and Food of Norway
Norwegian company founders
Norwegian businesspeople in shipping
Politicians from Skien
Ministers of Finance of Norway